The Milwaukee Brewers Wall of Honor is an exhibit located at American Family Field in Milwaukee, Wisconsin, that commemorates baseball players, coaches, executives, and broadcasters who have made significant contributions to the Milwaukee Brewers Major League Baseball team and meet set criteria regarding career milestones or service time. The team was established in Seattle, Washington, as the Seattle Pilots in 1969, and they became the Milwaukee Brewers after relocating to Wisconsin in 1970. The franchise played in the American League (AL) until 1998 when it moved to the National League (NL) in conjunction with a major league realignment.

Established by the Brewers in 2014, the initial Wall of Fame class consisted of 58 inductees. As of 2022, seventy-one individuals have been inducted. Each member is honored with a bronze plaque bearing their image and a summary of their Brewers career, which is affixed to an exterior wall by the Hot Corner entrance in left field.

Criteria
Unlike the American Family Field Walk of Fame exhibit, which selects individuals from both the Milwaukee Brewers and Milwaukee Braves through a vote by Wisconsin media members and Brewers executives, only retired Brewers who met at least one of nine criteria while with Milwaukee are inducted to the Wall of Honor. The original class of 58 inductees were added based on seven conditions.  Two additional criteria were added in 2015 and 2018. These nine conditions are:

2,000 or more plate appearances
1,000 or more innings pitched
250 or more games pitched
Winning a Most Valuable Player Award, Cy Young Award, Rookie of the Year Award, or Reliever of the Year Award
Managing a pennant-winning team
Being recognized with a statue on American Family Field's plaza
Being elected to the National Baseball Hall of Fame
Serving as a primary broadcaster for 20 or more seasons after playing career
Serving as general manager for 10 years or more and reaching the postseason

Inductees

Active players having met induction criteria

In addition to those inducted in the Wall of Honor, six active players meet the requirements for induction upon retirement.

See also
Milwaukee Braves Wall of Honor

References

External links
Official website

Wall
2014 establishments in Wisconsin
Awards established in 2014
Halls of fame in Wisconsin
Major League Baseball museums and halls of fame